Plectorhinchus is a genus of marine ray-finned fish, sweetlips belonging to the subfamily Plectorhinchinae which is one of two subfamilies in the family Haemulidae which also includes the grunts. The species in this genus are found in fresh, brackish, and salt waters.

Description and characteristics 
These fish have big, fleshy lips and tend to live on coral reefs in the Indo-Pacific in small groups or pairs. They will often associate with other fishes of similar species; several species of sweetlips sometimes swim together.
They are usually seen in clusters in nooks and crannies or under overhangs. At nightfall, they venture from their shelters to seek out their bottom-dwelling invertebrate prey, such as bristleworms, shrimps, and small crabs.

Sweetlips colouring and patterning changes throughout their lives. For example, Plectorhinchus polytaenia develops more stripes with age. Juvenile sweetlips generally look quite different from the adults, and often live solitary lives on shallower reef sections. Juveniles may be banded or spotted and are usually a completely different colour from the adults of their species. Small juveniles have an undulating swimming pattern, possibly mimicking poisonous flatworms as a means of predator avoidance.

Species
These are the currently recognized species in this genus:
 Plectorhinchus albovittatus (Rüppell, 1838) (Two-striped sweetlips)
 Plectorhinchus caeruleonothus J. W. Johnson & Worthington Wilmer, 2015 (Blue bastard) <ref name=Johnson2015>{{cite journal | last1 = Johnson | first1 = J.W. | last2 = Worthington Wilmer | first2 = J. | year = 2015 | title = Plectorhinchus caeruleonothus, a new species of sweetlips (Perciformes: Haemulidae) from northern Australia and the resurrection of P. unicolor (Macleay, 1883), species previously confused with P. schotaf (Forsskål, 1775) | journal = Zootaxa | volume = 3985 | issue = 4| pages = 491–522 | doi=10.11646/zootaxa.3985.4.2| pmid = 26250161 }}</ref> 
 Plectorhinchus ceylonensis (J. L. B. Smith, 1956) (Sri Lanka sweetlips)
 Plectorhinchus chaetodonoides Lacépède, 1801 (Harlequin sweetlips)
 Plectorhinchus chrysotaenia (Bleeker, 1855) (Yellow-striped sweetlips)
 Plectorhinchus chubbi (Regan, 1919) (Dusky rubberlip)
 Plectorhinchus cinctus (Temminck & Schlegel, 1843) (Crescent sweetlips)
 Plectorhinchus diagrammus (Linnaeus, 1758) (Striped sweetlips)
 Plectorhinchus faetela (Forsskål, 1775)
 Plectorhinchus flavomaculatus (G. Cuvier, 1830) (Lemonfish)
 Plectorhinchus gaterinus (Forsskål, 1775) (Blackspotted rubberlip)
 Plectorhinchus gibbosus (Lacépède, 1802) (Harry hotlips)
 Plectorhinchus griseus (G. Cuvier, 1830) 
 Plectorhinchus lessonii (G. Cuvier, 1830) (Lesson's thicklip)
 Plectorhinchus lineata (Linnaeus, 1758) (Yellowbanded sweetlips)
 Plectorhinchus macrolepis (Boulenger, 1899) (Biglip grunt)
 Plectorhinchus macrospilus Satapoomin & J. E. Randall, 2000 (Largespot sweetlips)
 Plectorhinchus makranensis Damadi, Moghaddam, Ghassemzadeh, Ghanbarifardi
 Plectorhinchus mediterraneus (Guichenot, 1850) (Rubberlip grunt)
 Plectorhinchus multivittatus (W. J. Macleay, 1878) (Many-lined sweetlips)
 Plectorhinchus obscurus (Günther, 1872) (Giant sweetlips)
 Plectorhinchus paulayi Steindachner, 1895 (Zebra sweetlips)
 Plectorhinchus pictus (Tortonese, 1936) (Trout sweetlips)
 Plectorhinchus picus (G. Cuvier, 1828) (Painted sweetlips)
 Plectorhinchus plagiodesmus Fowler, 1935 (Barred rubberlip)
 Plectorhinchus playfairi (Pellegrin, 1914) (Whitebarred rubberlip)
 Plectorhinchus polytaenia (Bleeker, 1853) (Ribboned sweetlips)
 Plectorhinchus schotaf (Forsskål, 1775) (Minstrel sweetlips)
 Plectorhinchus sordidus (Klunzinger, 1870) (Sordid rubberlip)
 Plectorhinchus umbrinus (Klunzinger, 1870)
 Plectorhinchus unicolor (W. J. Macleay, 1883) (Sombre sweetlips) 
 Plectorhinchus vittatus'' (Linnaeus, 1758) (Indian Ocean oriental sweetlips)

References

Plectorhinchinae
Extant Miocene first appearances
Taxa named by Bernard Germain de Lacépède
Marine fish genera